The Control Patrols of the Central Committee of Anti-fascist Militias of Catalonia was a public order force, mainly composed by CNT-FAI militias, replacing the official police forces which had been discredited after the coup d'etat of July 1936, as about half of the police forces had joined the Nationalist side. In Barcelona's neighborhoods, and in many towns of Catalonia, committees were created that managed their own local militias, and even coordinated to go to the front. The number of armed people in Barcelona was quite large due to the assault on the San Andrés Barracks, after which 30,000 rifles had been seized and were scattered throughout the city.

The organization was created in August 1936 with the mission of prosecuting collaborators of the military revolt. After a violent phase followed by a progressive control of the Generalitat of Catalonia, the patrols were dissolved in June 1937 due to the military and political control taken by the Communist Party of Spain and other pro-Soviet forces. During their short period of existence, these groups detained and executed many members of the Church, Carlists, and other people accused of being fascist or pro-nationalist in Barcelona and the surrounding areas.

Scope of action 
This revolutionary public order force acted in parallel to the Police Headquarters under the direction of the Junta de Seguridad del Comité. The patrols were coordinated by a General Secretariat, located at 617 Gran Via de les Corts Catalanes in Barcelona. The investigation services of the CNT-FAI functioned in cooperation to the control patrols. The patrols were divided into territorial sectors, in addition to port and railway patrols. Each section had a detention center and a delegate. The main detention center was found in the former convent of San Elías, at the foot of Tibidabo. Control of the sections was shared among parties with representation on the Junta de Seguridad del Comité. The CNT-FAI had control of the General Secretariat and the simple majority in most sectors.

Its scope of action was the districts of Barcelona, which at this time (August 1936) was experiencing a wave of revolution and violence. Numerous murders and crimes were taking place, with FAI releasing a document dated 30 July in which it distances itself from the excess violence:"An Investigation Committee functions as an appendix to the Committee of Anti-Fascist Militias, which will take care of verifying all the denunciations that are made about the activities of the elements involved in the past fascist movement. This committee is the only one, apart from the Superior Police Headquarters, which, from this moment, has the right to order and carry out house searches. WHATEVER IS DONE ON THE EDGE OF IT WILL BE AN OUTRAGE. And the FAI is willing to put an end to those groups of the unconscious, outside the control of our Organization, who, who knows for what purposes, dishonor the revolutionary movement of the people, who have taken up arms against fascism. We do not know what elements these are, but we affirm with energy, whoever they are, they are denounced by their own actions, in the best of cases, as cloudy souls, in which the just instinct of the people is adulterated, awakening primitive voices nested in the darkest of his conscience." - Solidaridad Obrera and Boletín de Información.The sectors consisted of militiamen from different political affiliations: Confederación Nacional del Trabajo (CNT), Esquerra Republicana de Catalunya (ERC), Unión General de Trabajadores (UGT) and Partido Obrero de Unificación Marxista (POUM). The distribution of militiamen per affiliation was as follows:

The CNT, despite having almost half of the militiamen of the patrols, only had delegates in 4 of the sectors (Poblenou, El Clot-El Poblet, Sant Andreu and Sants-Hostafrancs).

Violence 
The Patrols were the work of the Central Committee of Anti-Fascist Militias of Catalonia, and were promoted by the CNT and the FAI, and later supported by the rest of the Popular Front organizations to put an end to the violent chaos which occurred in Barcelona. In principle, it was about putting an end to the supporters of the military uprising who often fired from the city's balconies and roofs. But gradually their purpose extended and included containing the revolutionary violence of different neighborhood committees and unions. In these first months there were militias belonging to each political organization or union.

However, historians critical of the Republican side consider the Patrols to be dedicated to perpetrating arbitrary murders, especially of soldiers, businessmen and priests. According to this version, the detainees were taken to the dungeons of detention centers where they were tortured and finally executed after being taken to an isolated place; the euphemistically called paso (meaning ride/walk). According to César Alcalá, around 1500 people were executed (without a trial) by the Control Patrols between September 1936 and April 1937. The Control Patrols played this violent role during events such as the persecution of the Maristas in Barcelona in 1936, with 172 people being executed during the months of July to October of that year.

Critical voices against the Control Patrols increased as the Generalitat and the Unified Socialist Party of Catalonia (PSUC) took a position of stricter control over the anarchists. The Patrols were often self-servingly equated with the armed groups of CNT and FAI. This was due to their predominance in this police force. In Barcelona, the Civil Guard remained quartered for several months and the Assault Guard, despite being on the streets, barely served as a Republican police.

Pressure for disbandment from the Republican Party 
The Central Committee of Antifascist Militias ended up dissolving in September 1936, when CNT decided to enter the government of the Generalitat, on 27 September 1936. It was the first government in which anarchists participated. The government - originally called the Council of the Generalitat of Catalonia - was chaired by Josep Tarradellas who would also take charge of finances. To manage public order, an Internal Security Board was created, chaired by the new internal security advisor Artemi Aiguader i Miró, from ERC.

The Board was created on 5 October. In addition to Aiguader, who was the chairman, participators from ERC included Miquel Guinart and Joan Pons Garlandí; from CNT Vicente Gil Mata, Dionisio Eroles and Aurelio Fernández (the latter as general secretary); from PSUC Rafael Vidiella Franch and Joaquín Olaso; from Josep Coll; and from Unió de Rabassaires Cristóbal Rebull. The general commissioner of public order, the director of local administration and the head of central services of the security department attended as technical assistants. Immediately, the power struggle started between CNT, which intended to be an entity independent of the government, and ERC and PSUC, who wanted the Board to be an annex to the interior security adviser.

On 24 October 1936, the Internal Security Board approved an order according to which the Patrols should have a liaison agent with the Police Headquarters. José Asens, from CNT, agreed to this position and since then all searches and arrests were officially authorized and documented by him or by his secretary, Gutiérrez. Salvador González Albadalejo, representative of UGT in the Committee, was in charge of inspecting the activities of all the Patrol sections. From November 1936 the violent actions of the patrols were more limited. During the first half of 1937 it is difficult to discern the legal accusations of abuses of the counter-propaganda coming, above all, from the communists.

On 17 December 1936, there was a change inside the government of the Generalitat, known as the second Tarradellas Government. The internal security advisor continued to be Artemi Aiguader. Given the prevalence of CNT militants in the patrols, ERC and PSUC parties constantly complained about the sorry state of internal security in Catalonia and about the patrolmen being incapable of maintaining public order. The continuous political friction between the parties was also transferred to the sessions of the Security Board. Eusebio Rodríguez Salas was appointed General Commissioner of Public Order. It was in these days that a "bread war" began to take place between the Ministry of Supplies, directed by Comorera, against the neighborhood supply committees, which until then controlled food supply in the neighborhoods. The way in which supplies were managed in Barcelona was in practice a covert political struggle between the Generalitat and neighborhood committees, which were the bodies created after the July 1936 revolution. The tension produced confrontations, and at the same time, repression, revenge and settling accounts that tensed the atmosphere, in the midst of the suffering caused by the war. To stop this violence, it was decided to increase the number of patrol cars in Barcelona to 1,500, a figure that was never met.

On 25 January 1937, the events of La Fatarella (province of Tarragona) took place. These events went beyond the local sphere, producing clashes between the different political currents in various towns and in Barcelona. A dispute over some land in La Fatarella between collectivists and anti-collectivists led to a shootout, resulting in the death of a CNT patrolman. This fact prompted other patrolmen and volunteers, companions of the deceased, to come from Flix and Mora de Ebro. They were repelled and consequently asked Barcelona for help, which sent a truck of assault guards that was also repelled. But then the news reached the Pueblo Nuevo neighborhood of Barcelona, where the deceased was from, and about 60 men left for La Fatarella. They quickly took the town and the repression was brutal: between 50 and 60 shot dead and another 70 arrested.

These events made UGT abandon the organization of the Patrols. The discomfort was growing, the criticism in the newspapers of PSUC, ERC and UGT was constant, and it coincided with the undisciplined attitude of UGT patrolmen that they had been carrying for a few weeks given that their party, PSUC, had already decided to put an end to the Patrols and give strength to a single security council in the hands of the Generalitat government. On 29 January, at the meeting of the Control Patrols, it was decided to replace the UGT patrolmen with members of other forces.

During January and February there were discussions about the reorganization of public order in Catalonia. There were thousands of barracked assault guards and civil guards, who were seen by the revolutionaries as a threat to the revolution. But at the same time they were seen by the republicans and communists as a way to dispute power with the Patrols. On 15 February, the last meeting of the Internal Security Board took place, soon being displaced by a new public order board. This displacement was made without any reaction by the CNT.

On 4 March 1937, the Internal Security Corps was created by a decree and the patrols were ordered to be dissolved. The body was based on the assault forces, which were under the orders of the Generalitat, and the "Republican National Guard" (name under which the Civil Guard was then known), which depended on the central government. As a security measure in this body, its members were not allowed to be affiliated with any union or political party. This ordinance was a measure that tried to put an end to the influence of the Control Patrols in the streets of Barcelona. At the same time, by means of other decrees by which the defense councils of the municipalities were dissolved, the withdrawal of the militias from the borders was ordered. It was a measure destined to end the revolution, of which the Patrols were an essential part. In any case, they ignored the order of their dissolution and remained armed until June 1937.

On 25 March 1937, Josep Tarradellas, Acting Minister of Internal Security, ordered the transfer of various detainees to the General Police Station of Public Order of the Government in the ex-monastery of San Elías and the other sections controlled by the Patrols. The direct control of the Generalitat continued to increase. The May Days events revealed the offensive by the Generalitat, with the support of militiamen from PSUC, UGT and the Catalan state, against militiamen from CNT-FAI and POUM.

Dissolution 
The events of May marked the end of the patrols, since they were part of the revolutionary order that had prevailed in Barcelona since the first days of the war, which had been politically defeated in May. Some patrols sided with the CNT defense committees, the Libertarian Youth, the Friends of Durruti and the POUM armed groups.

On 4 June 1937, the order of final dissolution and delivery of all the weapons and identification plates of the patrols was published. Many former patrolmen went underground or marched to the front to avoid reprisals. On 9 June 1937, José Asens handed over the keys to the General Secretariat of Control Patrols and the rest of the barracks.

The role of the Patrols was assumed by the Military Information Service (SIM) of the Republic. The SIM reused most of the detention centers and put into practice more systematic and brutal methods of repression, not only against those suspected of being fascists but also against POUM militants and the anarchists.

References 

Anarchist organisations in Spain